John Reilly Costello (born December 24, 1960) is a former relief pitcher in Major League Baseball who played for the St. Louis Cardinals (-), Montreal Expos and San Diego Padres. He batted and threw right-handed.

Costello graduated from Oceanside High School in Oceanside, New York in 1979 and then played college baseball at Mercyhurst where he led all of NCAA with a 1.12 earned run average in 1982.

In a four-season career, Costello posted an 11–6 record with a 2.97 earned run average and four saves in 119 games pitched.

References

External links

1960 births
Living people
American expatriate baseball players in Canada
Arkansas Travelers players
Calgary Cannons players
Erie Cardinals players
Indianapolis Indians players
Las Vegas Stars (baseball) players
Louisville Redbirds players
Major League Baseball pitchers
Mercyhurst Lakers baseball players
Montreal Expos players
San Diego Padres players
Savannah Cardinals players
Sportspeople from the Bronx
Baseball players from New York City
St. Louis Cardinals players
St. Petersburg Cardinals players
Sportspeople from Nassau County, New York